Curraheen is a townland in County Tipperary in Ireland. Occupying 895 acres, it is located in the civil parish of Ballymoreen in the barony of Eliogarty in the poor law union of Thurles.

References

Townlands of County Tipperary